Adams and Woodbridge was an American architectural firm in the mid-twentieth-century New York City, established in 1945 by Lewis Greenleaf Adams, AIA, and Frederick James Woodbridge, FAIA, and disestablished in 1974 after the latter's death. It was the successor to the firms Evans, Moore & Woodbridge,  Malmfeldt, Adams & Prentice, Adams & Prentice (fl. 1929–1941), and Malmfeldt, Adams & Woodbridge

Adams & Woodbridge estimated in 1953 that their firm and its predecessors had been responsible for “about 100 residences and alterations.”

Works as Adams & Woodbridge  (1945-1974)
1947: New Jersey Manager's Association, Trenton, New Jersey, $750,000 
1947: (Addition to) Brick Presbyterian Church (Park Avenue), New York City, $600,000 
1947: Woodmere Academy, Woodmere, New York, $260,000 
1950: Alterations to Horace Mann Building, Teacher's College, Manhattan, $380,000 
1952: Brick Church Chapel, Manhattan, New York, $115,000 
1952: Trinity Cathedral renovation, Newark, New Jersey, $110,000 
1952: Westwood Elementary School, Westwood, New Jersey, $460,000 
1952: Cedar Grove Community Church, Cedar Grove, New Jersey, $114,000 
1953: Church of the Open Door, Brooklyn, New York, $160,000 
1957-1969: 12 buildings for the Adirondack Museum, Blue Mountain Lake, New York
1958: Hamilton College Dunham Dormitory, Clinton, New York
1959: Hamilton College Rudd Infirmary, Clinton, New York
1963: New York City Episcopal Church Center, New York City.
1966: Trinity Church Manning Wing, New York City.
1967: Harriet Phipps House, Girl Scouts Greater New York, New York City

Works responsible by either the various firms of Adams or Woodbridge
Henry R. Luce Residence (Gladstone, New Jersey), $150,000
Howard Phipps Residence (Westbury, New York), on Long Island, $380,000

References

External links
Adams & Woodbridge works.Held by the Department of Drawings & Archives, Avery Architectural & Fine Arts Library, Columbia University.

Defunct architecture firms based in New York City
Architects of cathedrals
American ecclesiastical architects
Architects of Presbyterian churches
Architects of Anglican churches
American residential architects
Companies based in Manhattan
Design companies established in 1945
Design companies disestablished in 1974
1945 establishments in New York City
1974 disestablishments in New York (state)